On March 3, 2008, four multimillion-dollar homes were set on fire in Echo Lake, Washington, on Echo Lake Road, off State Highway 522. Slogans spray-painted on one of the burned houses' fences attributed the arson to the Earth Liberation Front, with words such as "Built Green? Nope black! McMansions in RCDs r not green. ELF." ELF is a collective name for anonymous and autonomous individuals or groups that, use "economic sabotage and guerrilla warfare to stop the exploitation and destruction of the natural environment".

The houses were built in the summer of 2007 as part of "Seattle Street of Dreams" project, an annual luxury home showcase offered across the United States and parts of Canada. The 2007 theme was "green and sustainable building"; one property had won an award from a local group known as BuiltGreen.

Residents and drivers within the area immediately called nearby fire departments, who were able to save one of the four houses set on fire. The fire caused $7 million worth of damage. No one was injured in the fire, as the homes were unoccupied at the time.  The homes were rebuilt after the fire.

The FBI, police, and the Bureau of Alcohol, Tobacco, Firearms and Explosives are currently investigating the incident. Some question whether the arson was an ELF action or an act of insurance fraud. The developer of one of the houses destroyed in the fire has since pleaded guilty to multiple counts of first-degree theft associated with his construction projects.

References

External links 
 KIRO-TV

Earth Liberation Front
Eco-terrorism
Arson in Washington (state)
2008 fires in the United States
2008 in Washington (state)
Terrorist incidents in the United States in 2008
Building and structure fires in the United States
Residential building fires
Fires in Washington (state)
2008 crimes in the United States